Ronald Isley (born May 21, 1941) is an American recording artist, songwriter, record producer, and occasional actor. Isley is the lead singer and founding member of the family music group The Isley Brothers.

Early life
Born in 1941 to Sallye Bernice (née Bell) and O'Kelly Isley Sr, Isley was the third of six brothers (O'Kelly Isley Jr., Rudolph Isley, Vernon Isley, Ernie Isley, Marvin Isley). Ronald, like many of his siblings, began his career in the church. Isley began singing at the age of two, winning a $25 war bond (approx. $429 in 2022) for singing at a spiritual contest at the Union Baptist Church. By the age of seven, Isley was singing on-stage at venues such as the Regal Theater in Chicago, alongside Dinah Washington and a few other notables.

Career
By his early teens, Isley was singing regularly with his brothers in church tours and also first appeared on TV on Ted Mack's Amateur Hour. In 1957, 16-year-old Isley and his two elder brothers O'Kelly and Rudy then 19 and 18 moved to New York to pursue a music career. While in New York, Isley and his brothers began recording doo-wop for local labels before landing a major deal with RCA Records in 1959, where the trio wrote and released their debut single "Shout". By the summer of 1959, the Isley family had moved from Cincinnati to a home in Englewood, New Jersey.

Isley has been the Isley Brothers' most longstanding member as well as the main lead vocalist, occasionally sharing with his older brothers. In 1969, Isley reformed T-Neck Records with his brothers in a need to produce themselves without the control of record labels, forming the label shortly after ending a brief tenure with Motown. In 1973, the group's style and sound changed following the release of the 3 + 3 album where brothers Ernie Isley and Marvin Isley and in-law Chris Jasper joined the founding brothers' full-time. The younger brothers had been providing instrumental help for the brothers since the late 1960s. By the mid-1970s, Isley was living in Teaneck, New Jersey.

After Kelly Isley's death in 1986 and Rudy Isley's departure to the ministry in 1989, Ronald has carried on with the Isley Brothers name either as a solo artist or with accompanying help from younger brothers, particularly Ernie. In 1990, Isley scored a top-ten duet with Rod Stewart with a cover of his brothers' hit "This Old Heart of Mine (Is Weak for You)", and in 2003 Ronald recorded a solo album, Here I Am: Bacharach Meets Isley, with Burt Bacharach. In addition, Ron Isley became a sought-after hook singer for R. Kelly, Warren G, 2Pac and UGK. Isley released his first solo album Mr. I on November 30, 2010. The album includes the first single "No More". It debuted at number 50 on the Billboard 200, selling 22,243 copies. It was his first solo album to crack that chart.

In 2010, Isley received a "Legend Award" at the Soul Train Music Awards. In 2013, Ronald released his second solo album This Song Is For You sign labels eOne. Ronald received a nominees Independent R&B/Soul Artist Performance, at the Soul Train Music Awards. In 2014, Ronald made a cameo appearance in the music video for the Kendrick Lamar song "i".

Including his work on songs recorded by the Isley Brothers and R. Kelly, Isley's singles appeared on the US Billboard Hot 100 charts in six straight decades, from the 1950s (1959's "Shout") through the 2000s (2001's "Contagion"). His 2015 appearance on Lamar's "How Much a Dollar Cost" peaked just under the Hot 100 at 109, and his 2021 Isley Brothers track "Friends and Family" failed to hit the main Billboard chart (although it was a Top 50 hit on the R&B and Hip-Hop chart), but do serve to extend his appearances on Billboard charts to eight separate decades.

Ronald Isley was inducted into the Rock and Roll Hall of Fame in 1992 as a member of the Isley Brothers.

Personal life

Isley married Margret Tinsley in 1960, and in 1969 their daughter Tia Isley was born. In 1993, he married singer Angela Winbush in Los Angeles, California. They quietly divorced in early 2002. 

Isley suffered a mild stroke in London in 2004, which halted an Isley Brothers tour. In September 2005, he married background singer Kandy Johnson of the duo JS/Johnson Sisters.Their son, Ronald Isley, Jr., was born in December 2006. In 2007, it was reported Isley had kidney problems. Isley still resides in St. Louis.

Tax evasion
In 2006, Isley was convicted of tax evasion charges and sentenced to three years and one month in prison. Isley's sentence was affirmed by the United States Court of Appeals for the Ninth Circuit. Isley was imprisoned at the Federal Correctional Institution at Terre Haute, Indiana, and was scheduled for release on April 13, 2010. He was moved to a half-way house (Dismas House) in St. Louis, Missouri, following an early departure that October. After his sentence was completed, Isley was released from a federal half-way house on April 13, 2010. Isley is listed as one of California's most delinquent taxpayers, with a $303,411.43 debt from a lien filed on October 22, 2002.

Discography

Academic title
 Honorary doctorate of music, awarded by the Berklee College of Music, May 7, 2016.

References

External links

1941 births
Living people
African-American male singers
American male singers
American hip hop singers
American tenors
American funk singers
American male pop singers
American soul singers
American people convicted of tax crimes
The Isley Brothers members
Midwest hip hop musicians
Musicians from Cincinnati
Musicians from St. Louis
People from Englewood, New Jersey
People from Teaneck, New Jersey
Singers from Ohio
Singers from New Jersey
20th-century American singers
21st-century American singers
Grammy Award winners for rap music
African-American rock singers